Todd Township is the name of some places in the U.S. state of Pennsylvania:

Todd Township, Fulton County, Pennsylvania
Todd Township, Huntingdon County, Pennsylvania

Pennsylvania township disambiguation pages